Ryan Riddle (born July 5, 1981) is a former professional American, Canadian and Arena football defensive end. He was drafted by the Oakland Raiders as a linebacker in the sixth round, with the 38th pick (212th overall) of the 2005 NFL Draft. He played college football at University of California, Berkeley.

Riddle has also been a member of the New York Jets, Atlanta Falcons, Baltimore Ravens, Los Angeles Avengers and Calgary Stampeders.

Ryan Riddle is the grandson of former USC Trojan fullback John RIddle and Helen Wheeler. John Riddle was the first Trojan to score four touchdowns in one game, and in 1924 he and Bryce Taylor of USC were the first African Americans to play against a southern college team. Helen Wheeler graduated from USC Law School in 1927, making her the school's first African American woman to do so.

Early years
Ryan Riddle attended Culver City High School in Culver City, California, California. As a junior, he was Culver City's Most Improved Player, an All-Area second team honoree, and led the Bay League with 17 sacks. As a senior, he was the team Most Valuable Player, and an All-Bay League first team honoree and he finished his senior season with seven sacks, three blocked field goals, and 125 tackles. Ryan Riddle graduated from Culver City High School in 1999. He decided to go on to El Camino College after a two-year hiatus from football and turning down scholarship opportunities from several colleges.

College career
 Ended up as El Camino's team MVP his sophomore year on his way to receiving a scholarship from the University of California. While at El Camino he earned third-team JC All-American when he racked up 12 sacks, three blocked field goals, two blocked punts, three fumble recoveries, two caused fumbles, one interception and two touchdowns scored. He was also named to the 2002 All-Region IV Team by the California Community College Coaches Association/JC Athletic Bureau and tabbed first-team All-Northern Division. 

Ryan Riddle attended California and was a two-year letterman in football. As a senior, he posted a single season school record 14.5 sacks, and 49 tackles. Following the 2004 season, Riddle was voted Defensive MVP by teammates and  selected as a second team All-American by the Associated Press.

Professional career
Riddle was selected in the sixth round (212th overall) of the 2005 NFL Draft by the Oakland Raiders. In September 2006, Riddle was cut by the Raiders. He signed with the New York Jets' active roster on September 27, 2006. He was released on December 16, 2006, and later signed on with the Atlanta Falcons. In August 2007, Riddle signed with the Baltimore Ravens, but was waived prior to the beginning of the 2007 regular season, despite a 2 sack performance against the Falcons.

After being waived by the Ravens, Riddle signed with the Los Angeles Avengers of the Arena Football League on a two-year contract. In his first and only season with the Avengers he set a franchise rookie sack record with 3.5. The next year the arena league opted to cancel their season.

Riddle was signed by the Calgary Stampeders on February 27, 2009, but was released shortly after.

Post-football
Riddle wrote for the sports website Bleacher Report. He continues to evaluate NFL draft classes at the website he founded, draftmetric.com.

Notes

External links
 Calgary Stampeders bio
 Los Angeles Avengers bio
 Profile at NFL.com

1981 births
Living people
American football defensive ends
American football linebackers
Canadian football linebackers
American players of Canadian football
California Golden Bears football players
Oakland Raiders players
New York Jets players
Atlanta Falcons players
Baltimore Ravens players
Los Angeles Avengers players
Calgary Stampeders players